Heinrich Funk (1807–1877) was a German landscape painter.

Biography
Funk was born in Herford, Westphalia. He was a pupil of Johann Wilhelm Schirmer at the Düsseldorf Academy.

Works
Funk was gifted with keen observation, a fine sense of beauty of form and line, and his pictures are notable for perfect drawing, minute execution, and poetic conception, often combined with splendid light effects. As well as his paintings, he also left more than five hundred charcoal and pencil drawings of sterling quality.

Among those in public galleries at the turn of the 20th century were:
Castle Ruin in the Gloaming (1834), National Gallery, Berlin
Lower Inn Valley (1846), and Ruin by the Lake(1852), Städel Institute, Frankfort
The Kaisergebirge in the Inn Valley, and Stormy Weather in the Eifel, Stuttgart Museum

Notes

Further reading

External links

1807 births
1877 deaths
German landscape painters